Maryland Academy of Technology and Health Sciences (MATHS) was a public charter school in Baltimore, Maryland, United States that opened in 2006 and closed in 2018. The school was open to all students, did not charge tuition and provided a comprehensive college preparatory education for students in grades 6 through 12. There was an emphasis on preparing students for future careers in biotechnology and health sciences. The school was funded by the state of Maryland and was founded by Rebekah Ghosh in an effort to help the city's faltering graduation rates and better prepare students for solid careers.

References

Public high schools in Maryland
Public middle schools in Maryland
Charter schools in Maryland
Educational institutions established in 2006
2006 establishments in Maryland
Educational institutions disestablished in 2018
2018 disestablishments in Maryland
Public schools in Baltimore